The Boatyard Historic District, in Sullivan and Hawkins counties near Kingsport, Tennessee is a  historic district which was listed on the National Register of Historic Places in 1973.  The listing included seven contributing buildings, four contributing sites, and a contributing object.

Paraphrasing, it includes area on the north side of the South Fork of the Holston River, area on both sides of the North Fork
of the Holston River.  It includes the lower end of the Long Island of the Holston (a U.S. National Historical Landmark).  It includes most of the land included in the 1802 town of Christianville, all of the land, except the area north of the railroad, included in the 1818 town of Rossville, the Christian's Fort area; and the Rotherwood area. <end paraphrasing>

Architecture: Late Victorian, Federal

Historic function: Domestic; Transportation; Defense; Commerce/trade
Historic subfunction: Department Store; Water-related; Single Dwelling; Fortification; Road-related; Battle Site

References

Historic districts on the National Register of Historic Places in Tennessee
National Register of Historic Places in Hawkins County, Tennessee
National Register of Historic Places in Sullivan County, Tennessee
Federal architecture in Tennessee
Victorian architecture in Tennessee
Buildings and structures completed in 1775